Laurence Nelson Golborne Riveros (born Lorence Nelson Golborne Riveros Santiago, July 11, 1961) is a Chilean engineer and entrepreneur. He was minister of public works until November 7, 2012, when he announced his decision to run for President of Chile. He previously had been bi-minister of Mining and Energy in the administration of President Sebastián Piñera. He withdrew from the presidential campaign on April 29, 2013, after two consecutive public scandals.

Family and education 

Golborne grew up in Maipú, a working-class commune in the south-west of the capital Santiago, where his father, Wilfred, a merchant of English descent developed his entrepreneurial streak through an ironmonger business.

The youngest of six children in the family, as a teenager Golborne became involved in meetings that the conservative National Party was organizing against the Popular Unity government. Nevertheless, his family situation is described as diverse, with members sympathetic to both the left and the right.

Golborne graduated from the Instituto Nacional José Miguel Carrera, and then was admitted to the Pontifical Catholic University of Chile, where he pursued civil engineering. In university he was honored as the best graduate of his class. He married Karin Oppermann, after annulling his first Catholic marriage. Later, he studied business administration at Northwestern and Stanford universities in the United States.

Golborne is a Roman Catholic.

Government career 

Golborne was appointed Minister of Mining on March 11, 2010 by President Sebastián Piñera. As minister, he oversaw the 2010 Copiapó mining accident rescue operations. His management of the rescue operation resulted in his becoming the most popular politician in Chile.

On January 14, 2011 Golborne was designated Minister of Energy by president Piñera. He was sworn in on January 16, 2011.

In July 2011, Golborne was appointed minister of public works. On November 7, 2012 he announced his candidacy in the 2013 Chilean presidential election. He withdrew from the presidential campaign on April 29, 2013, after two consecutive public scandals.

In July 2016, Golborne was charged by the Chilean government prosecutor for tax offenses.

In popular culture 
Actor Rodrigo Santoro portrays Golborne in the 2015 film The 33, directed by Patricia Riggen.

References

External links 

Entrevista de 2007 con El Sábado de El Mercurio.
Entrevista de mayo de 2009 con Revista Poder&Negocios, reproducida por Revista Cosas.
Entrevista de 2010 con La Segunda como ministro designado de Minería.
Discurso reproducido por el sitio web de la Escuela de Ingeniería de la PUC.

1961 births
Living people
Chilean people of English descent
Chilean Roman Catholics
People from Santiago
2010 Copiapó mining accident
Chilean Ministers of Mining
Pontifical Catholic University of Chile alumni
Instituto Nacional General José Miguel Carrera alumni
Stanford Graduate School of Business alumni
Kellogg School of Management alumni
Candidates for President of Chile